NGC 1199 is an elliptical galaxy approximately 107 million light-years away from Earth in the constellation of Eridanus. It was discovered by William Herschel on December 30, 1785.

NGC 1199 is dominated by stellar light with little long wavelength emission.

Together with NGC 1189, NGC 1190, NGC 1191 and NGC 1192 it forms Hickson Compact Group 22 (HCG 22) galaxy group. Although they are considered members of this group, NGC 1191 and NGC 1192 are in fact background objects, since they are much further away compared to the other members of this group.

Image gallery

See also 
 Lenticular galaxy 
 Hickson Compact Group
 List of NGC objects (1001–2000)
 Eridanus (constellation)

References

External links 

 
 SEDS

Elliptical galaxies
Eridanus (constellation)
1199
11527
Hickson Compact Groups
Astronomical objects discovered in 1785
Discoveries by William Herschel